Sheila Mary McClemans,  (3 May 1909 – 10 June 1988) was an Australian servicewoman, lawyer, barrister and company director. She set up the first all female law firm in Western Australia and was the first female barrister to appear before the Supreme Court of Western Australia.

Early life
Sheila McClemans was born to Ada Lucy Walker and William Joseph McClemans in Claremont, Western Australia on 3 May 1909. She attended the Perth Modern School.

Legal career
McClemans was one of the first graduates of the law school at the University of Western Australia in 1930. She was admitted to the Bar on 16 May 1933. When McClemans and her friend Molly Kingston were unable to find work in a law firm they set up the first all woman law firm in Western Australia. She was the first woman barrister to appear before the Supreme Court of Western Australia. McClemans held several leadership roles in the legal profession including secretary of the Western Australia Law Society, foundation member of the Western Australia Legal Aid Commission, and the State Parole Board of Western Australia.

Military service
McClemans enlisted in the Women's Royal Australian Naval Service (WRANS) in 1943 during the Second World War.

Awards
McClemans was appointed an Officer of the Order of the British Empire in 1951, and a Companion of the Order of St Michael and St George in 1977. She was also awarded the Queen Elizabeth II Silver Jubilee Medal in 1977. Her portrait painted by Nora Heysen is in the collection of the Australian War Memorial, Canberra.

Personal life
McClemans married Frank Morrison Kenworthy (1899–1976) in 1949. She died in Dalkeith, Western Australia, on 10 June 1988.

References

1909 births
1988 deaths
Australian Companions of the Order of St Michael and St George
Australian military personnel of World War II
Australian Officers of the Order of the British Empire
Australian women lawyers
Lawyers from Perth, Western Australia
People educated at Perth Modern School
University of Western Australia alumni
Women in the Australian military
20th-century women lawyers